Fall River Lake is a reservoir in Greenwood County, Kansas, United States.

History
Construction of the dam was started on May 9, 1946. The embankment closure was completed on August 12, 1948, and the conservation pool was filled on June 9, 1949. The project was completed for full flood control operation in April 1949.

See also

 Fall River State Park
 Toronto Lake, northeast of Fall River Lake
 List of Kansas state parks
 List of lakes, reservoirs, and dams in Kansas
 List of rivers of Kansas

References

External links

Official
 Fall River Lake, US Army Corps of Engineers
 Fall River Lake Recreation Areas, US Army Corps of Engineers
Maps
 Greenwood County Maps: Current, Historic, KDOT

Dams in Kansas
Reservoirs in Kansas
United States Army Corps of Engineers dams
Buildings and structures in Greenwood County, Kansas
Bodies of water of Greenwood County, Kansas